Ota's bent-toed gecko (Cyrtodactylus otai) is a species of lizard in the family Gekkonidae. The species is endemic to Vietnam.

Etymology
The specific name, otai, is in honor of Japanese herpetologist Hidetoshi Ota.

Geographic range
C. otai is found in northwestern Vietnam, in Hòa Bình Province and Sơn La Province.

Habitat

Description

Reproduction
C. otai is oviparous. Clutch size is two eggs. Each egg measures on average 14 mm x 9 mm (0.55 in x 0.35 in).

References

Further reading
Nguyen TQ, Le MD, Pham AV, Ngo HN, Hoang CV, Pham CT, Ziegler T (2015). "Two new species of Cyrtodactylus (Squamata: Gekkonidae) from the karst forest of Hòa Bình Province, Vietnam". Zootaxa 3985 (3): 375–390. (Cyrtodactylus otai, new species).
Nguyen TQ, Pham AV, Ziegler T, Ngo HT, Le MD (2017). "A new species of Cyrtodactylus (Squamata: Gekkonidae) and the first record of C. otai from Sơn La Province, Vietnam". Zootaxa 4341 (1): 25–40.

Cyrtodactylus
Reptiles described in 2015